Teratoscincus is a genus of geckos commonly referred to as wonder geckos or frog-eyed geckos; it is the only genus within the subfamily Teratoscincinae of the family Sphaerodactylidae. Species in the genus Teratoscincus are found from the Arabian Peninsula in Qatar, the United Arab Emirates, and Oman, west across southern Asia in Iran, Afghanistan, and Pakistan, north to Russia, Kazakhstan, Turkmenistan, Uzbekistan, and Tajikistan to Mongolia and China. The genus consists of nine species.

Member species
The genus Teratoscincus contains the following nine species which are recognized as being valid.
Teratoscincus bedriagai  –  Bedraiga's wonder gecko, Bedriaga's plate-tailed gecko
Teratoscincus keyserlingii  – Persian wonder gecko
Teratoscincus mesriensis 
Teratoscincus microlepis  – small-scaled wonder gecko
Teratoscincus przewalskii  – Przewalski's wonder gecko
Teratoscincus roborowskii 
Teratoscincus rustamowi 
Teratoscincus scincus  – common wonder gecko, frog-eyed gecko
Teratoscincus sistanense 

Nota bene: A binomial authority in parentheses indicates that the species was originally described in a genus other than Teratoscincus.

In captivity
T. roborowskii is frequently found in the exotic animal trade. It is suitable for keeping in a desert vivarium.

References

Further reading
Strauch A (1863). "Characteristik zweier neuen Eidechsen aus Persien ". Bulletin de l'Académie Impériale des Sciences de St-Pétersbourg 6: 477–480. (Teratoscincus, new genus, p. 480; Teratoscincus keyserlingii, new species, p. 480). (in Latin and German).

External links
Teratoscincus scincus captive care 

 
Reptiles of Central Asia
Fauna of Pakistan
Taxa named by Alexander Strauch